LG Optimus L4 II is a smartphone designed and manufactured by LG Electronics. It is a part of the second generation of the product range called LG L-Style (advertised with Optimus L1 II, Optimus L3 II, Optimus L5 II, Optimus L7 II and Optimus L9 II.

Operating system is Android 4.1.2 Jelly Bean.

Features 
Optimus L4 II is a mid-range device, no special features, and the launch price was 129 euro. It has the Optimus LG user interface.

The processor is a Mediatek 6575 1 GHz single core processor with 512 MB of RAM and 4 GB of internal memory, which can be increased by memory cards microSD and  microSDHC up to 32 GB.

The screen is a 3.8in HVGA, with resolution 320x480 pixels (about 160 dpi), made with IPS technology. It is equipped with Wi-Fi and Bluetooth connectivity, and a battery of 1700 mAh or 2150 mAh.

See also
Android
Google
LG Optimus
LG Optimus L1 II
LG Optimus L3 II
LG Optimus L5 II
LG Optimus L7 II
LG Optimus L9 II

References

External links 
 Pagina ufficiale di LG Optimus L4 II

Android (operating system) devices
LG Electronics smartphones
Discontinued smartphones